The Cathedral of Curtea de Argeș (early 16th century) is a Romanian Orthodox cathedral in Curtea de Argeș, Romania. It is located on the grounds of the Curtea de Argeș Monastery, and is dedicated to Dormition of the Mother of God.  The building is the seat of the Archdiocese of Argeș and Muscel.

The cathedral is faced with pale grey limestone, which was easily chiselled then hardened on exposure. The interior is of brick, plastered and decorated with frescoes. Nearby on the grounds stands the large Neo-Romanian style Royal Palace built in late 19th century.

Architecture

The building resembles a very large and elaborate mausoleum, and was built in the Byzantine architectural style, with arabesques. In shape the structure is oblong, with a many-sided annex at the back. A dome rises in the center, fronted by two smaller twisting and leaning cupolas, while a secondary dome, broader and loftier than the central one, springs from the annex. Each summit is crowned by an inverted pear-shaped stone, bearing a triple cross, emblematic of the Trinity.

The windows are mere slits; those of the tambours (the cylinders on which the cupolas rest) are curved and slant at an angle of 70 degrees, as though the tambours were leaning to one side.

Between the pediment and the cornice a thick corded moulding is carried round the main building. Above this comes a row of circular shields, adorned with intricate arabesques, while bands and wreaths of lilies are everywhere sculptured on the windows, balconies, tambours and cornices, adding lightness to the fabric.

Facing the main entrance is a small open shrine, consisting of a cornice and dome upheld by four pillars.

Inscriptions
The archives of the cathedral were plundered by Hungarians and Turks, but several inscriptions, Greek, Slav, and Roman, are left.

One tablet records that the founders were Prince Neagoe Basarab (1512–1521) and his wife Milica Despina of Wallachia; another that Prince, Radu de la Afumati completed the work in 1526; a third describes the repairs executed in 1681 by Prince Șerban Cantacuzino; a fourth, the restoration, in 1804, by Joseph, the first bishop. Between 1875 and 1885 the cathedral was reconstructed, and in 1886 it was reconsecrated.

Legends 
Legends of Curtea de Argeș have inspired many Romanian poets, among them the celebrated Vasile Alecsandri. One traditional legend describes how Neagoe Basarab, while a hostage in Constantinople, designed a splendid mosque for the sultan, returning to build the cathedral out of the surplus materials.

Manole legend
A legend tells of Radu Negru employing a Meşterul Manole or Manoli as architect. With Manole being unable to finish the walls, the prince threatened him and his assistants with death. At last Manole suggested that they should follow the ancient custom of placing a living woman into the foundations; and that she who first appeared on the following morning should be the victim. The other masons warned their families, and Manole was forced to sacrifice his own wife. Thus the cathedral was built.

When Manole and his masons told the prince that they could always build an even greater building, Radu Negru had them stranded on the roof so that they could not build something to match it. They fashioned wooden wings and tried to fly off the roof, but, one by one, they all fell to the ground. A spring of clear water, named after Manole, is said to mark the spot where he fell.

This motif is widespread in South-East Europe, most notably also in Russia, like the blinding of the Masons of Saint Basil's Cathedral by Ivan the Terrible.

Burials
Neagoe Basarab V, Reigning Prince of Wallachia
Despina Princess Consort of Wallachia
Petru, Prince of Wallachia
Ion, Prince of Wallachia
Anghelina, Princess of Wallachia
Stana, Princess of Wallachia and Princess Consort of Moldavia, wife of Stephen IV of Moldavia
Radu V, Reigning Prince of Wallachia
Ruxandra, Princess of Moldavia and Princess Consort of Wallachia, wife of Radu V of Wallachia 
Carol I, King of Romania
Elisabeth, Queen of Romania
Maria, Princess of Romania
Ferdinand I, King of Romania
Marie, Queen of Romania
Carol II, King of Romania
Michael I, King of Romania
Anne, Queen of Romania
Helen, Queen Mother of Romania
Mircea, Prince of Romania

On 16 December 2017, King Michael I was buried here with a full state funeral, his remains joining those of his wife Queen Anne, who had died in 2016. Those attending the funeral included Carl XVI Gustaf of Sweden and Queen Silvia, Juan Carlos I of Spain and Queen Sofia, Charles, Prince of Wales, Henri, Grand Duke of Luxembourg, and Princess Astrid and Prince Lorenz of Belgium.

The remains of Queen Mother Helen, the mother of King Michael, were returned to Romania from the Bois-de-Vaux Cemetery in Switzerland on 18 October 2019. They were interred in the cathedral on 19 October.

Gallery

References

External links

Monastery website 

Cathedral
Romanian Orthodox cathedrals in Romania
Romanian Orthodox monasteries of Wallachia
Historic monuments in Argeș County
16th-century Eastern Orthodox church buildings
Byzantine sacred architecture
Burial sites of the House of Wied-Neuwied
Burial sites of the House of Hohenzollern-Sigmaringen